Mina Pirquitas is a town and municipality in Jujuy Province in Argentina in the Rinconada Department, in Coyaguaima district, 355 km from the capital of Jujuy, accessed from the town of Abra Pampa by provincial routes 7 and RP 70 (138 km).

Geography
The population of the settlement at the mine ranges up to 673 inhabitants, though during initial construction, the region housed about 2000 inhabitants. There are two centers: one administrative (offices, laboratories, hospital, house and chapel) and another to the west about 7 miles where "The streak" and where most of the mines are located.

Importance
It lies in one of the most important mining areas. The vein contains mostly cassiterite, a mineral that contains among other elements tin, zinc, and silver. There are traces of other elements such as gold, lead, iridium, palladium and tungsten. Also reported small amounts of radioactive minerals and rare in some parts of the mine.

References

Populated places in Jujuy Province